Rita Oraá Larrazabal (born 27 July 1963) is a Spanish former volleyball player who competed in the 1992 Summer Olympics. She was born in the Basque city of Vitoria-Gasteiz but she lived in the nearby village of Nanclares de la Oca during her whole childhood and adolescence.

She was a member of the Spain women's national volleyball team which took part in the 1992 Summer Olympics. The team got an Olympic Diploma (8th place). 
Up to today, she has been the only Basque voleibol player who has taken part in an Olympic Games.

References

1963 births
Living people
Spanish women's volleyball players
Olympic volleyball players of Spain
Volleyball players at the 1992 Summer Olympics
Sportspeople from Álava